Marquard Rudolf Reichsritter von Rodt zu Bußmannshausen, or Roth (9 April 1644, Konstanz, Holy Roman Empire – 10 July or 6 October 1704, Hegne) was, from 1689 to 1704, the prince-bishop of the Bishopric of Constance.

Personal life
Marquard Rudolf von Rodt came from Upper Swabian knightly nobility of the Freiherren von Rodt zu Bußmannshausen. His father was Johann Dietrich, knight chief and heir of Kempten Abbey; His mother was Maria Barbara von Westerstetten.

He was the first of three members of his family who became Bishops of Constance (preceding Franz Konrad von Rodt and ).

Biography
Marquard Rudolf was recorded in 1653 as an ex-spectant of the Constituency of the Cathedral. He gave his first profession in 1666 and studied at the University of Strasbourg. After becoming sub-deacon and deacon, he was admitted to the chapter of Second Profession. On 26 May 1668, he received the ordination of priest. From 1668 onward, he was a canon in Augsburg and, since 1660, by his episcopal nomination, in Konstanz as well as cantor (1673), archdeacon (1683), and, from 1686, dean at the Konstanz Minster. In 1686 he became president of the clergy council in Constance.

On 14 April 1689, he was elected bishop of Constance in the third round by a narrow majority against the candidate of the Viennese court, Johannes Wolfgang von Bodman, and on 6 March 1690 by Pope Alexander VIII. On 18 June 1690 the Bishop ordained Constance's auxiliary bishop Johannes Wolfgang von Bodman; Consecrated with Augsburger Auxiliary Bishop .

In addition to the bishop's office, he was "Lord of the Reichenau (domini Augia maioris) and Öhningen."

His episcopal office was marked by political disputes with France. In addition, the treasury of the imperial court at the Hochstift burdened his work.

Marquard Rudolf died in Hegne Castle and was buried in the cathedral at Constance.

Literature

External links

References

People from Konstanz
Roman Catholic bishops of Constance
1644 births
1704 deaths
17th-century German Roman Catholic bishops
18th-century German Roman Catholic bishops